An amine oxidase is an enzyme that catalyzes the oxidative cleavage of alkylamines into aldehydes and ammonia:

RCH2NH2 + H2O + O2  RCHO + NH3 + H2O2

Amine oxidases are divided into two subfamilies based on the cofactor they contain:

References

External links 
 

EC 1.4.3